The 1975 NCAA Division I Men's Outdoor Track and Field Championships were contested June 3−7 at the 53rd annual NCAA-sanctioned track meet to determine the individual and team national champions of men's collegiate Division I outdoor track and field events in the United States.

This year's meet was hosted by Brigham Young University at Cougar Stadium in Provo, Utah. (The track was removed from the stadium in 1982.)

The UTEP Miners finished just ahead of UCLA in the team standings and captured their first team national title. The title marked the beginning of UTEP's reign as a track & field dynasty – in the following seven seasons, they finished either as champion or runner-up, including five consecutive titles (1978–82).

This was the last edition of the NCAA championships with the races measured in yards; race distances were changed to meters for 1976.

Team result 
 Note: Top 10 only
 (H) = Hosts

References

NCAA Men's Outdoor Track and Field Championship
NCAA Division I Outdoor Track and Field Championships
NCAA
NCAA Division I Outdoor Track and Field Championships